FC Kuusankoski is a football club from Kuusankoski, Kouvola in Finland.  The club was formed in 1996 and their home ground is at the Kuusankosken urheilupuisto.  The men's first team currently plays in the Kakkonen (Second Division).  The head coach of FC Kuusankoski is Janne Pahkala.

Background
FC Kuusankoski was founded 24 October 1996 as a result of the merger of Voikkaan Pallo-Peikot and Kumu-Peikot Kuusankoski.  This enabled the new club in 1997 to start in the Kakkonen.

The club has played 4 seasons in the Ykkönen (First Division), the second tier of Finnish football in the period 2001 to 2004.  They also have had two spells in the third tier, the Kakkonen (Second Division), from 1997 to 2000 and 2005 to the present day.

FC Kuusankoski is the junior club of the Kumu Junior Team.  Kuusankosken Kumu played in the Veikkausliiga, the Finnish Premier league, for one season in 1990.

Season to season
{|
|valign="top" width=0%|
{|  class="wikitable"
|- style="background:#f0f6fa;"
!Season
!Level
!Division
!Section
!Administration
!Position
!Movements
|-
|style="background:#77DD77;"|2000
|style="background:#77DD77;"|Tier 3
|style="background:#77DD77;"|Kakkonen (Second Division)
|style="background:#77DD77;"|East Group
|style="background:#77DD77;"|Finnish FA (Suomen Pallolitto)
|style="background:#77DD77;"| 1st
|style="background:#77DD77;"|Promoted
|-
|style="background:#87CEFA;"|2001
|style="background:#87CEFA;"|Tier 2
|style="background:#87CEFA;"| Ykkönen (First Division)
|style="background:#87CEFA;"|South Group
|style="background:#87CEFA;"| Finnish FA (Suomen Pallolitto)
|style="background:#87CEFA;"| 7th
|style="background:#87CEFA;"|
|-
|style="background:#87CEFA;"|2002
|style="background:#87CEFA;"|Tier 2
|style="background:#87CEFA;"| Ykkönen (First Division)
|style="background:#87CEFA;"|South Group
|style="background:#87CEFA;"| Finnish FA (Suomen Pallolitto)
|style="background:#87CEFA;"| 5th
|style="background:#87CEFA;"| Relegation Group – 4th
|-
|style="background:#87CEFA;"|2003
|style="background:#87CEFA;"|Tier 2
|style="background:#87CEFA;"| Ykkönen (First Division)
|style="background:#87CEFA;"|
|style="background:#87CEFA;"| Finnish FA (Suomen Pallolitto)
|style="background:#87CEFA;"| 12th
|style="background:#87CEFA;"|
|-
|style="background:#87CEFA;"|2004
|style="background:#87CEFA;"|Tier 2
|style="background:#87CEFA;"| Ykkönen (First Division)
|style="background:#87CEFA;"|
|style="background:#87CEFA;"| Finnish FA (Suomen Pallolitto)
|style="background:#87CEFA;"| 13th
|style="background:#87CEFA;"| Relegated
|-
|style="background:#77DD77;"|2005
|style="background:#77DD77;"|Tier 3
|style="background:#77DD77;"|Kakkonen (Second Division)
|style="background:#77DD77;"|East Group
|style="background:#77DD77;"|Finnish FA (Suomen Pallolitto)
|style="background:#77DD77;"| 3rd
|style="background:#77DD77;"|
|-
|style="background:#77DD77;"|2006
|style="background:#77DD77;"|Tier 3
|style="background:#77DD77;"|Kakkonen (Second Division)
|style="background:#77DD77;"|Group A
|style="background:#77DD77;"|Finnish FA (Suomen Pallolitto)
|style="background:#77DD77;"| 11th
|style="background:#77DD77;"|
|-
|style="background:#77DD77;"|2007
|style="background:#77DD77;"|Tier 3
|style="background:#77DD77;"|Kakkonen (Second Division)
|style="background:#77DD77;"|Group A
|style="background:#77DD77;"|Finnish FA (Suomen Pallolitto)
|style="background:#77DD77;"| 2nd
|style="background:#77DD77;"|
|-
|style="background:#77DD77;"|2008
|style="background:#77DD77;"|Tier 3
|style="background:#77DD77;"|Kakkonen (Second Division)
|style="background:#77DD77;"|Group A
|style="background:#77DD77;"|Finnish FA (Suomen Pallolitto)
|style="background:#77DD77;"| 3rd|style="background:#77DD77;"|
|-
|style="background:#77DD77;"|2009
|style="background:#77DD77;"|Tier 3
|style="background:#77DD77;"|Kakkonen (Second Division)
|style="background:#77DD77;"|Group A
|style="background:#77DD77;"|Finnish FA (Suomen Pallolitto)
|style="background:#77DD77;"| 11th|style="background:#77DD77;"|
|-
|style="background:#77DD77;"|2010
|style="background:#77DD77;"|Tier 3
|style="background:#77DD77;"|Kakkonen (Second Division)
|style="background:#77DD77;"|Group A
|style="background:#77DD77;"|Finnish FA (Suomen Pallolitto)
|style="background:#77DD77;"|
|style="background:#77DD77;"|
|}4 seasons in Ykkönen7 seasons in Kakkonen
|}

Club Structure
FC Kuusankoski run a number of teams including 1 men's teams, 1 ladies team, 1 boys team and 1 girls team.

2010 seasonFC Kuusankoski Men's Team''' are competing in Group A (Lohko A) of the Kakkonen administered by the Football Association of Finland  (Suomen Palloliitto) ''.  This is the third highest tier in the Finnish football system.  In 2009 FC Kuusankoski finished in eleventh position in their Kakkonen section.

References and sources
Official Website 
Finnish Wikipedia
Suomen Cup
 FC Kuusankoski Facebook

Footnotes

Football clubs in Finland
Kouvola
Association football clubs established in 1996
1996 establishments in Finland